The 2018 Caribbean Club Championship was the 20th edition of the Caribbean Club Championship (also known as the CFU Club Championship), the first-tier annual international club football competition in the Caribbean region, held amongst clubs whose football associations are affiliated with the Caribbean Football Union (CFU), a sub-confederation of CONCACAF.

The winners of the 2018 CONCACAF Caribbean Club Championship would qualify to the 2019 CONCACAF Champions League, the second and third place teams would qualify to the 2018 CONCACAF League, while the fourth place team would play against the winners of the 2018 CONCACAF Caribbean Club Shield, as long as the Shield winners fulfill the CONCACAF Regional Club Licensing criteria, in a playoff match to determine the final Caribbean spot to the 2018 CONCACAF League.

Cibao were the title holders, but were not eligible to enter since they failed to reach the final of the 2017 Liga Dominicana de Fútbol. For the second season in a row, the CONCACAF Caribbean Club Championship was won by a team from the Dominican Republic, with Atlético Pantoja crowned champions and qualifying for the CONCACAF Champions League. Runners-up Arnett Gardens and third place Portmore United qualified for the CONCACAF League, but fourth-placed Central lost to Shield winners Club Franciscain in a playoff and failed to qualify for the CONCACAF League.

Teams

The CONCACAF Council, at its meeting on 25 July 2017 in San Francisco, California approved the implementation of the following two-tier competitions for affiliated clubs of Caribbean Member Associations starting in 2018:
The Tier 1 competition, known as the CONCACAF Caribbean Club Championship, is contested by the champions and runners-up of the top professional and semi-professional leagues in year 1 (2018), and open to only fully professional leagues in year 2 (2019) and onwards.
The Tier 2 competition, known as the CONCACAF Caribbean Club Shield, is contested by the champions of the top leagues in Member Associations that have no professional or semi-professional leagues in year 1 (2018), and open to amateur and semi-professional leagues in year 2 (2019) and onwards.

The new two-tier format of the CONCACAF Caribbean Club Championship and CONCACAF Caribbean Club Shield, as well as the teams participating in each tournament, were announced by CONCACAF on 15 December 2017. Among the 31 CFU member associations, four of them were classified as professional leagues and each may enter two teams in the CONCACAF Caribbean Club Championship.

A total of eight teams from four associations entered the 2018 CONCACAF Caribbean Club Championship (officially the 2018 Flow CONCACAF Caribbean Club Championship for sponsorship reasons).

Group stage
The draw for the group stage was held on 21 December 2017, 11:00 EST (UTC−5), at the CONCACAF Headquarters in Miami, United States, and was streamed on YouTube. The eight teams were drawn into two groups of four. The two group stage hosts were placed in Pot 1, while the remaining six teams were placed in Pot 2. Teams from the same association could not be drawn into the same group.

The matches were played between 31 January – 4 February 2018 (Group A) and 7–11 February 2018 (Group B). The top two teams of each group advanced to the final stage.

Group A
Host venue: Ato Boldon Stadium, Couva, Trinidad and Tobago. All times local, AST (UTC−4).

Group B
Host venue: Estadio Cibao FC, Santiago de los Caballeros, Dominican Republic. All times local, AST (UTC−4).

Final stage
Jamaica was announced as the host nation of the final stage on 1 May 2018. The matches were played between 11–16 May 2018.

Bracket
The semi-final matchups are:
Group A Winners vs. Group B Runners-up
Group B Winners vs. Group A Runners-up

Host venue: Anthony Spaulding Sports Complex, Kingston, Jamaica. All times local, EST (UTC−5).

Semi-finals

Third place match
Winners qualified for 2018 CONCACAF League. Losers advanced to CONCACAF League playoff against the 2018 CONCACAF Caribbean Club Shield winners for a place in the 2018 CONCACAF League.

Final
Winners qualified for 2019 CONCACAF Champions League. Losers qualified for 2018 CONCACAF League.

CONCACAF League playoff

The CONCACAF League playoff was played between the 2018 CONCACAF Caribbean Club Championship fourth-placed team, Central, and the 2018 CONCACAF Caribbean Club Shield winners, Club Franciscain, with the winners qualifying for the 2018 CONCACAF League.

Top goalscorers

See also
2018 Caribbean Club Shield
2018 CONCACAF League
2019 CONCACAF Champions League

References

External links
CFU Club Championship, CFUfootball.org

2018
1
2018 CONCACAF League
2019 CONCACAF Champions League
January 2018 sports events in North America
February 2018 sports events in North America
May 2018 sports events in North America
International association football competitions hosted by the Dominican Republic
International association football competitions hosted by Trinidad and Tobago
International association football competitions hosted by Jamaica